Apple Valley is a city in northwestern Dakota County in the State of Minnesota, and a suburb of the Twin Cities. The population was 56,374 at the 2020 census, making it the 17th most populous city in Minnesota. In 2014, Money.com named Apple Valley the 17th best place to live in the United States, up from 20th in 2010, 24th in 2008 and 28th in 2007.

History
The area that became Apple Valley was first established in 1858 as Lebanon Township, and remained a farming community for nearly a century. In the mid-1950s, residential developments started replacing farmland. Orrin Thompson, a real estate developer, was responsible for the city's early development. He contracted a company to determine where the next growth in the Twin Cities would be. Thompson bought the first houses and streets from the Brobacks, who built the city's first four houses. The firm that selected this area was in Apple Valley, California, so Thompson took that name for the development. An alternate explanation for the name change exists, however. According to local developer Henry Broback, Lebanon Township was renamed Apple Valley because "...when you drive east on (County Road) 42 and turn to enter Lebanon, it reminded them of Apple Valley, California, which was a nice community."

Voters in the township voted to incorporate in the 1968 general election. They also selected the name Apple Valley over the name Lebanon Valley by a vote of 1376 to 757.

Geography
The downtown area and its adjacent residential district (which formed the original core of the city when it was incorporated) are in a shallow valley.

Demographics

Apple Valley is in Minnesota's 2nd congressional district, represented by Angie Craig, a Democrat. Apple Valley is represented in the Minnesota Legislature by State Senator Greg Clausen (Democrat, District 57), Representative Robert Bierman (Democrat, District 57A), and Representative John Huot (Democrat, District 57B).

2010 census
As of the census of 2010, there were 49,084 people, 18,875 households, and 13,382 families living in the city. The racial makeup of the city was 83.8% White, 5.5% African American, 0.4% Native American, 5.3% Asian, 0.1% Pacific Islander, 2.0% from other races, and 3.0% from two or more races. Hispanic or Latino of any race were 4.9% of the population.

There were 18,875 households, of which 35.2% had children under the age of 18 living with them, 56.7% were married couples living together, 10.2% had a female householder with no husband present, 4.0% had a male householder with no wife present, and 29.1% were non-families. 23.6% of all households were made up of individuals, and 6.4% had someone living alone who was 65 years of age or older. The average household size was 2.58 and the average family size was 3.07.

The median age in the city was 37.9 years. 25.4% of residents were under the age of 18; 7.3% were between the ages of 18 and 24; 27.5% were from 25 to 44; 30.2% were from 45 to 64; and 9.6% were 65 years of age or older. The gender makeup of the city was 48.5% male and 51.5% female.

2000 census
As of the census of 2000, there were 45,527 people, 16,344 households, and 12,405 families living in the city. The racial makeup of the city was 91.81% White, 1.91% African American, 0.29% Native American, 3.39% Asian, 0.04% Pacific Islander, 0.88% from other races, and 1.69% from two or more races. Hispanic or Latino of any race were 2.00% of the population.

There were 16,344 households, out of which 42.5% had children under the age of 18 living with them, 63.7% were married couples living together, 9.0% had a female householder with no husband present, and 24.1% were non-families. 19.3% of all households were made up of individuals, and 4.0% had someone living alone who was 65 years of age or older. The average household size was 2.77 and the average family size was 3.21.

In the city, the population was spread out, with 29.7% under the age of 18, 7.2% from 18 to 24, 33.1% from 25 to 44, 24.4% from 45 to 64, and 5.5% who were 65 years of age or older. The median age was 34 years. For every 100 females, there were 95.6 males. For every 100 females age 18 and over, there were 92.4 males. For several years, the city's population was among the fastest growing in Minnesota, but it has virtually exhausted the amount of additional buildable land within city limits, and so its growth has slowed considerably since 1990.

The median income for a household in the city was $69,752, and the median income for a family was $79,335 (these figures had risen to $76,789 and $86,874 respectively as of a 2007 estimate). Males had a median income of $50,636 versus $33,315 for females. The per capita income for the city was $29,477. About 1.1% of families and 2.1% of the population were below the poverty line, including 2.0% of those under age 18 and 3.8% of those age 65 or over.

Politics

Economy

Top employers
According to Apple Valley's 2016 Comprehensive Annual Financial Report, the top employers in the city are:

Arts and culture

Annual cultural events
Apple Valley hosts an annual July 4 festival called "Apple Valley Freedom Days" Festivities include one of the area's largest parades that features local marching bands, service organizations, and many local businesses. There is also a carnival and a fireworks display during the event.

In February, the city hosts the Apple Valley Winter Carnival. Events include ice skating, a medallion hunt, contests and children events.

The Minnesota Zoo
Apple Valley is home to the Minnesota Zoo, a nationally recognized zoological garden that houses hundreds of animals from several distinct climatological zones. Collections include an indoor Tropics Trail featuring animals from the worlds rain forests and tropical habitats, the Minnesota Trail with native animals from Minnesota including black bears, wolves, wolverines and beaver pond. The Northern Trail features large animals from the worlds cold climates. Highlights of this trail are musk ox, Asian wild horses, Takins from China and animals from remote east coast including brown bears, amur leopards, and wild boars. The zoo also features an aquarium, an exhibit of penguins from South Africa and the popular Japanese snow monkeys,

Education
There are six elementary, three middle and three high schools in the city, all operated by Independent School District 196. In addition to the two comprehensive high schools, Apple Valley is home to a magnet school open to 11th and 12th graders, the School of Environmental Studies. In fall 2007, Independent School District 196 opened three elementary-level magnet schools: Cedar Park Elementary, which will become a Science, Technology, Engineering and Math (STEM) magnet; Diamond Path Elementary, which will have an International Studies theme, and Glacier Hills Elementary, with an Arts and Science theme. In 2017, Independent School District 196 opened a new Elementary school in neighboring Lakeville, Minnesota. Some students attend public schools in other school districts chosen by their families under Minnesota's open enrollment statute.

Infrastructure

Transportation
Interstate Highway 35E, Cedar Avenue, and County Road 42 are three of the main routes in Apple Valley. Highway 77 briefly enters the northern part of Apple Valley and becomes County Road 23 / Cedar Avenue.

Minnesota Valley Transit Authority operates many weekday commuter buses to and from Downtown Minneapolis and Saint Paul. The recently built Red Line operates as a dedicated bus line with service to and from the Mall of America.

Notable people
 Brianna Brown, actor, Days of Our Lives, Devious Maids
 David Fischer, former American ice hockey defenseman for the Montreal Canadiens
 Mark Hall, folkstyle and freestyle wrestler, NCAA Wrestling Champion, attended Apple Valley High School
 Erik Jensen, American actor, playwright, screenwriter and director
 Tyus Jones, Point guard for the NBA Memphis Grizzlies. Won the 2015 NCAA Basketball championship with the Duke Blue Devils, and was on the cover for the Sports Illustrated issue celebrating the championship.
 Tre Jones, point guard for the San Antonio Spurs. Tyus' younger brother.
Vincent Kartheiser, actor, attended Apple Valley High School prior to beginning his career. Had roles in shows such Mad Men and Angel, and films like Alaska, Another Day in Paradise and many others. 
 Carolyn Jane Rodriguez, Minnesota legislator
 Coleen Rowley, former FBI agent and 9/11 whistleblower who was named Time magazine's "Person of the Year" in 2002
 Nicholas Sadler, actor who has appeared in the films Scent of a Woman, Disclosure, Mobsters, as well as the TV shows The Cosby Show and ER
 Dan Sexton, former ice hockey forward for the Anaheim Ducks
 Gable Steveson, Olympic gold medalist in freestyle wrestling (2020 Tokyo)
 Maria Thayer, actress who has appeared in sitcoms Strangers with Candy and Will & Grace, as well as in the films Hitch and Accepted
 Gary Trent Jr., Shooting guard for the Toronto Raptors NBA team
 Lindsey Vonn (née Kildow), Olympic skier
 Darril Wegscheid, Minnesota state senator

References

External links

 Apple Valley Chamber of Commerce website
 Apple Valley official city government website
 History of Apple Valley
 ePodunk: Profile for Apple Valley, Minnesota

Cities in Minnesota
Cities in Dakota County, Minnesota
Minneapolis–Saint Paul